Ludwig Bruck was an Australian medical practitioner and medical journalist. He was the compiler of the first five editions of the Australasian Medical Directory and Handbook between 1883 and 1900.

References 

19th-century Australian medical doctors
Australian journalists
Medical journalists
Australian people of German descent
Year of birth missing
Year of death missing